Out of the Silent Planet is a science fiction novel by the British author C. S. Lewis, first published in 1938 by John Lane, The Bodley Head. Two sequels were published in 1943 and 1945, completing the Space Trilogy.

Plot
While on a walking tour, the philologist Elwin Ransom is drugged and taken on board a spacecraft bound for a planet called Malacandra. His abductors are Devine, a former college acquaintance, and the scientist Weston. Wonder and excitement relieve his anguish at being kidnapped, but he is put on his guard when he overhears his captors discussing their plans to turn him over to the inhabitants of Malacandra as a sacrifice. 

Soon after the three land, Ransom escapes and then runs off in terror upon first seeing the vaguely humanoid but alien sorns. In his wanderings, he finds that all the lakes, streams, and rivers are warm, that gravity is significantly lower than on Earth, and that the plants and mountains are all extremely tall and thin. After meeting a hross named Hyoi, a civilised native of a different species, Ransom becomes a guest for several weeks in Hyoi's village, where he uses his philological skills to learn the language. Discovering that gold (known as "sun's blood"), is plentiful on Malacandra, he discerns Devine's motive for making the voyage.

While out hunting, Ransom and his hrossa companions are told by an eldil, an almost invisible, angelic creature, that Ransom must go to meet Oyarsa, who is ruler of the planet, and indeed that he should already have done so. Shortly after, Hyoi is shot dead by Devine and Weston as they track Ransom and Ransom is directed by the hrossa to comply with the eldil's instructions and cross the mountains to the cave of a sorn named Augray. 

On the way Ransom discovers that he has almost reached the limit of breathable air and has to be revived by Augray with a flask of oxygen. The next day, carrying Ransom on his shoulder, Augray takes him across the bleak tableland and down into another river valley to Meldilorn, the island home of Oyarsa. There Ransom meets another species, a pfifltrigg who tells him about the beautiful houses and works of art that his people make in their native forests. 

Ransom is led to Oyarsa, who explains that there is an Oyarsa for each of the planets in the solar system. However, the Oyarsa of Earth - which is known as Thulcandra, "the silent planet" - has become "bent", or evil, and has been restricted to Earth after "a great war" on the authority of Maleldil, the ruler of the universe. Ransom is ashamed at how little he can tell the Oyarsa of Malacandra about Earth, and how foolish he and other humans seem to Oyarsa. 

While the two are talking, Devine and Weston are brought in, guarded by hrossa, because they have killed three members of that species. Weston does not believe that Oyarsa exists and he is incapable of conceiving that the Malacandrians are anything but ignorant natives, exploitable and expendable. This emerges in the course of a long speech in which Weston justifies his proposed invasion of Malacandra on "progressive" and evolutionary grounds. Weston's motives are shown to be more complex than profit: he is bent on expanding humanity through the universe, abandoning each planet and star system as its resources are exhausted and it becomes uninhabitable. In Ransom's attempts at translation, the brutality and crudity of Weston's ambitions are laid bare. 

While acknowledging that Weston is acting out of a sense of duty to his species and does not share Devine's greed for gold, Oyarsa tells Weston and Devine that he cannot tolerate their disruptive presence on Malacandra. He directs them to leave the planet immediately, despite very unfavourable orbital conditions. Oyarsa offers Ransom the option of staying on Malacandra, but Ransom decides he does not belong there either. The three men voyage back to Earth in the spaceship, and their 90 days' worth of air and other supplies nearly run out before they arrive. 

In the final chapter, Lewis introduces himself as a character into his own novel. He had written to Ransom enquiring whether he had come across the Latin word Oyarses, discovered in a mediaeval Neoplatonist work. This prompts Ransom to share his secret and the two resolve to hinder Weston from doing further evil in view of "the rapid march of [contemporary] events".

Characters 
Dr Elwin Ransom – A professor of philology at a college of the University of Cambridge. 
Dr Weston – A thick-set physicist, ruthless and arrogant, who mocks "classics and history and such trash" in favour of the hard sciences.
Dick Devine – Weston's accomplice who "was quite ready to laugh at Weston's solemn scientific idealism. He didn't give a damn, he said, for the future of the species or the meeting of two worlds."  
Hyoi – Ransom's first hross contact.
Hnohra – An older hross who acts as Ransom's language teacher.
Augray – A mountain-dwelling sorn.
Kanakaberaka – A pfifltrigg who carves Ransom's portrait onto a stone at Meldilorn.
Oyarsa – The spirit ruler of Malacandra whose demand to meet a human before allowing further exploration of his planet precipitates the kidnapping of Ransom.

Hrossa, séroni, and pfifltriggi
On Malacandra there are three native species of reasoning hnau.

The hrossa (singular hross) resemble bipedal otters or seals, and they are somewhat taller and thinner than humans. Ransom finds them beautiful: "covered, face and all, with thick black animal hair, and whiskered like a cat ... glossy coat, liquid eye, sweet breath and whitest teeth". They live in the low river valleys (handramit in the speech of the eldila), which they travel by boat, and specialise in farming, fishing, and such performing arts as dancing and poetry. Their technical level is low, and they wear only pocketed loincloths. Their speech is characterised by adding an initial /h/ sound to the words in the planet's common vocabulary. Their sense of humor is "extravagant and fantastic".

The séroni (singular sorn; the plural is sometimes given as sorns) are thin, fifteen-foot-high humanoids having coats of pale feathers and seven-fingered hands. They live in mountain caves of the high country (harandra in the speech of the eldila), though they often descend into the handramit where they raise giraffe-like livestock. They are the scholars and thinkers of Malacandra, specializing in science and abstract learning. Their technical level is high, and they design machinery, which is built by the pfifltriggi. Although they can write, they do not compose written works of history or fiction as they feel the hrossa are superior at it. Their sense of humor "seldom got beyond irony".

The pfifltriggi (singular pfifltrigg) have tapir-like heads and frog-like bodies; they lean their elbows on the ground when at rest, and sometimes when working with their hands. Their movements are quick and insectlike. They are the builders and technicians of Malacandra. They build houses and gadgets thought up by the séroni. They are miners who especially like to dig up "sun's blood" (gold) and other useful and beautiful minerals. Their sense of humor is "sharp and excelled in abuse".

Members of the three races do not believe any one of the races to be superior to the others; they acknowledge, rather, that no single race can do everything.

Glossary
 Arbol — The Sun.
 Crah — The final section of a poem.
 Eldil, pl. eldila — Being of light, similar to a spirit.
 Field of Arbol – Solar System.
 Handra — Land or planet.
 Harandra — High earth; plateau. 
 Handramit — Low earth; valley.
 Hlab — Language.
 Hluntheline — Long for, yearn for, desire (for the future).
 Hnakra, pl. hnéraki — A vicious aquatic beast hunted by the hrossa. 
 Hnakrapunt, pl. hnakrapunti — Hnakra-slayer.
 Hnau — Rational creature.
 Honodraskrud — Ground-weed.
 Hressa Hlab - Language of the hrossa.
 Hressni — Female hrossa.
 Hross, pl. hrossa — One of three species of hnau on Malacandra.
 Malacandra — A compound noun, formed with the prefix Malac and the noun handra,  referring to the fourth planet from the Sun; Mars.
 Maleldil — Ruler of the Oyéresu.
 Oyarsa, pl. Oyéresu — (Title) = Ruler of a planet, a higher-order eldil.
 Perelandra — A compound noun, formed with the prefix Perel and the noun handra; Venus.
 Pfifltrigg, pl. pfifltriggi — One of three species of hnau on Malacandra.
 Sorn, pl. séroni — One of three species of hnau on Malacandra.
 Surnibur - Language of the séroni.
 Thulcandra — A compound noun, formed with the prefix Thulc, meaning "silent", and handra; "Silent Planet" or Earth.
 Wondelone — Long for, yearn for, miss (from the past).

Background
Lewis wrote Out of the Silent Planet during 1937 after a conversation with J. R. R. Tolkien in which both men lamented the state of contemporary fiction. They agreed that Lewis would write a space travel story and Tolkien would write a time travel story. In fact, Tolkien never completed his story, while Lewis went on to compose two others over the war years in Britain. These three books are now referred to as the Cosmic or Space Trilogy, or occasionally as The Ransom trilogy after the main character, Elwin Ransom.  

Lewis was an early reader of H.G. Wells and had been given a copy of The First Men in the Moon as a Christmas present in 1908. Ransom makes dismissive references to Wells' conceptions in the course of the novel, but Lewis himself prefaced early editions of the novel with the disclaimer that "Certain slighting references to earlier stories of this type which will be found in the following pages have been put there for purely dramatic purposes. The author would be sorry if any reader supposed he was too stupid to have enjoyed Mr. H. G. Wells' fantasies or too ungrateful to acknowledge his debt to them." Another early work of space fiction which he later acknowledged was David Lindsay's A Voyage to Arcturus (1920).

But there were other speculative works in answer to which Out of the Silent Planet was written as a decided reaction. In both Olaf Stapledon's Last and First Men (1930) and an essay in J. B. S. Haldane's Possible Worlds (1927), Lewis detected what he termed Evolutionism, an amoral belief that humanity could perfect from itself a master race that would spread through the universe. Such was the ideology that Weston championed in his debate with Oyarsa, only to have it travestied by Ransom's translation of it into Malacandran.  

In the end, very few of the novel's original reviewers even realised that Lewis' intent was to substitute theological values through its means for those he deplored on the side of Scientism. Noting this omission, he pointed out to one of his correspondents that "any amount of theology can now be smuggled into people’s minds under cover of romance without their knowing it". In the novel itself, Ransom proposes a similar but subtler approach in his letter to Lewis quoted in the postscript: "What we need for the moment is not so much a body of belief as a body of people familiarized with certain ideas. If we could even effect in one per cent of our readers a change-over from the conception of Space to the conception of Heaven, we should have made a beginning."

What Lewis actually offers as substitute views are a series of reversals. His Malacandra is in fact the planet Mars which, named after the Roman god of war, was once viewed astrologically as the influencer of self-assertion and disruption. However, in place of Wells' scenario in The War of the Worlds, in which the inhabitants of Mars come to Earth as invaders, Lewis portrays a world of different species living in harmony from which members of his own corrupted species are expelled as bringers of violence and exploitation. Again, the clock is turned back from the world view of the post-mediaeval Renaissance to that of the Renaissance of the 12th century with the novel's vision of the universe as "the field of Heaven" peopled by  aetheric angels. It had been the aim of Lewis' scholastic study The Allegory of Love (1936) to revalidate the standpoint of the mediaeval literature flowing from that time and a reference to one of its key authors is introduced as the reason for Lewis to contact Ransom in the first place. In Lewis's study, the authors of the Platonic School of Chartres are presented as "pioneers of medieval allegorical poetry…For them, Nature was not opposed to Grace but, rather, an instrument of Grace in opposing the Unnatural", which is one of the transformative ideas with which the novel's readers are to be familiarized. Bernardus Silvestris's study of the creation underpins Oyarsa's discussion with Ransom in the novel.

Weston's speech and its translation

The speech which Weston delivers at the book's climax (in Chapter 20), and Ransom's effort to render it into the language of Malacandra, demonstrates the gulf in cultural and moral perceptions between the planetary mind sets and may be said to make a sort of social criticism.

Publication history
(Information has been gleaned from the Library of Congress, the Internet Speculative Fiction Database, and WorldCat.)

References

Further reading
 Downing, David C, Planets in Peril: A Critical Study of C. S. Lewis's Ransom Trilogy. University of Massachusetts Press, 1992.

External links
 
 
 Quotations and Allusions in C. S. Lewis, Out of the Silent Planet, by the English-to-Dutch translator Arend Smilde (Utrecht, The Netherlands)
 Out of the Silent Planet (Canadian public domain e-text)

1938 British novels
The Space Trilogy books
Christian science fiction 
1938 science fiction novels
British science fiction novels
Space exploration novels
Novels set on Mars
Novels set in University of Cambridge
The Bodley Head books
John Lane (publisher) books